Assabet Valley Regional Technical High School (AVRTHS) is a public vocational high school in the city of Marlborough, Massachusetts, United States.

History
Assabet Valley Regional Technical High School opened on September 5, 1973. It is the single school administered by the Assabet Valley Regional Vocational School District, which comprises the towns of Berlin, Hudson, Maynard, Northborough, Southborough, and Westborough, and the city of Marlborough. Each municipality elects by popular vote one member to the district's school committee.  The first-ever meeting of the Assabet Valley Regional Vocational District School Committee was on April 24, 1968, and the district was legally established under Massachusetts General Laws in 1969.

Assabet Valley's educational mission focuses heavily on vocational instruction, although in recent years they have expanded their academic offerings as well.

From 2012 to 2015 the school undertook a $62.4-million renovation of its aging building. The Massachusetts School Building Authority provided just over fifty percent of the project cost, while the school district's municipalities covered the remainder.

Athletics
Assabet Valley's athletic teams are known as the Aztecs. Their main rivals—especially in football—are neighboring public high schools Hudson and Marlborough.

In the spring and summer of 2017 Assabet renovated its athletic facilities for the first time since their construction in 1973. The $2.4-million project included a new turf football field, new bleachers, a rubberized track, renovated baseball and softball fields, and renovated tennis and basketball courts. The school district did not assess its member municipalities for the project, instead using available funds and selling naming rights to the new athletic complex.

References

Vocational education in the United States
Schools in Middlesex County, Massachusetts
Public high schools in Massachusetts
1973 establishments in Massachusetts